William Constantino may refer to:

 William P. Constantino (1911–1989), American judge and member of the Massachusetts House of Representatives
 William Constantino Jr. (born 1944), American lawyer and member of the Massachusetts House of Representatives